NGTS-1 is a solitary red dwarf located in the constellation Columba (constellation). With an apparent magnitude of 15.52, it requires a powerful telescope to be seen. The star is located 716 light years away from the Solar System, but is drifting away with a high radial velocity of 97.2 km/s.

Properties

NGTS-1 is an ordinary red dwarf with 61% the mass of the Sun, and is 42.7% smaller than the latter. NGTS-1 has a solar metallicity, and rotates at a rate too low to be measured accurately.

Planetary system 
The red dwarf is known to have one hot Jupiter orbiting it, which is very unusual for stars its type.

References 

Columba (constellation)
M-type main-sequence stars
Planetary systems with one confirmed planet